More Creedence Gold is an album by the band Creedence Clearwater Revival and was released in 1973. It is the follow-up to the album Creedence Gold, which was released in 1972.

The two Gold compilations combined are incomplete in terms of charted hits as "Green River", "Commotion", "Travelin' Band", "Long as I Can See the Light" and "Someday Never Comes" do not appear in either volume.

Track listing

Personnel
Doug Clifford - drums
Stu Cook - bass
John Fogerty - lead guitar, harmonica, lead vocals
Tom Fogerty - rhythm guitar, backing vocals (except Side 2, track 1)

References

Creedence Clearwater Revival compilation albums
1973 compilation albums
Fantasy Records compilation albums
Albums produced by John Fogerty
Albums produced by Stu Cook
Albums produced by Saul Zaentz